Eresh can refer to:
A city in ancient Sumer, possibly Uruk or Abu Salabikh
Akkadian pronunciation of NIN (cuneiform), a Sumerian word which can denote a "queen" or a "priestess".